Schwarzerium semivelutinum is a species of beetle in the family Cerambycidae. It was described by Schwarzer in 1925.

References

Callichromatini
Beetles described in 1925